Wodan Timbur Coaster is a wooden roller coaster, located in the Europa-Park in Rust, Baden-Württemberg. The coaster opened on March 31, 2012.

Ride

Wodan Timbur Coaster is located in the Iceland section of the park that opened in 2009. The coaster intertwines with two attractions: Atlantica SuperSplash and Blue Fire. The coaster is the park's first wooden coaster and was built by Great Coasters International that was responsible for many coasters around the world including Troy at Toverland and El Toro at Freizeitpark Plohn. Wodan Timbur Coaster is equipped with three GCI Millennium Flyer trains that feature polyurethane wheels instead of the usual steel wheels.

Name
The coaster was named using the Old Saxon name of the Germanic god Odin. Timbur is the Icelandic word for wood, so Timbur Coaster is wooden coaster.

Theme

Wodan Timbur Coaster is based on Norse mythology. The queue features several heavily detailed elements, including fire, mist and water effects. The goddess of death, Hel, is also featured and has a turning sand timer. Projection Mapping, smoke screens and moving ceilings are also used in the indoor sections, which immerse guests in mythology. In the ride station, statues watch the train leave and turn to watch the train arrive. The ride also has several dives into tunnels and heavy interaction with surrounding areas.

Rankings

See also
 2012 in amusement parks

References

External links

 

Roller coasters in Germany
Rides at Europa-Park